The 2013–14 season was Oxford United's fourth season in League Two after returning from the Conference. They finished 8th in the League, one place better than the previous season but again failing to secure a play-off place after a promising start. 

In the first half of the season Oxford led the table several times and were rarely outside the automatic promotion places, mainly thanks to an impressive points haul away from home (they were the last team in the top four divisions to be beaten away from home, not losing an away match in the league until defeat at Newport County in February). On 25 January 2014, with the club faltering though still in the play-off places, Chris Wilder resigned as manager to take up the reins at relegation-threatened Northampton Town. Mickey Lewis subsequently became the caretaker manager for a second time for the club. On 22 March 2014, Gary Waddock was appointed the head coach of the club after a lengthy interview process, leaving his job as Head of Coaching at MK Dons. Neither Lewis nor Waddock managed to halt the Us' loss of form and they slipped out of the play-off places in the final few weeks of the season, losing 11 of their last 15 league fixtures and finishing a disappointing eighth in the table, 9 points off the last play-off place.

United were knocked out of both the League Cup and FA Cup by Championship side Charlton Athletic. At half-time in the FA Cup 3rd round an upset had seemed likely when Oxford were beating their higher-division opponents 2–0, but they conceded two goals to the home side in the second half and were beaten 3–0 in the subsequent replay at the Kassam Stadium.

It was the club's 120th year in existence, their 114th of competitive football and their 65th since turning professional. This article covers the period from 1 July 2013 to 30 June 2014.

Team kit

Match fixtures and results

Pre-season friendlies

League Two
For more information on this season's Football League Two, see 2013–14 Football League Two. Oxford United's home games are played at the Kassam Stadium.

Results

Results summary

Results by round

League table

FA Cup

Football League Cup

Football League Trophy

Oxfordshire Senior Cup

Squad statistics

Appearances and goals

Top scorers

Disciplinary record

Transfers

References

2013-14
2013–14 Football League Two by team